Brandon Ríos vs. Urbano Antillón was a boxing Lightweight championship match for the WBA Lightweight championship. The bout was held on July 9, 2011, at Home Depot Center, in Carson, California, United States and televised on Showtime.

Build up
A bout between both Ríos and Antillón was to take place on the undercard of Antonio Margarito vs. Roberto Garcia. The fight was called off due to a cut sustained during sparring on the eyebrow of Ríos.

Entrance performers
The Mexican singer José Manuel Figueroa performed as Ríos entered the arena.

Main card
Lightweight Championship  Brandon Ríos vs.  Urbano Antillón
Ríos defeated Antillón via technical knockout at 2:39 in the third round.
Light Middleweight bout:  Carlos Amado Molina vs.  Kermit Cintron
Molina defeated Cintron via unanimous decision (98-92, 98-92, 98-92).

Preliminary card
Lightweight bout:  José Javier Román vs.  Randy Arrellin
Román defeated Arrellin via knockout at 2:07 in the first round.
Featherweight bout:  Gabino Sáenz vs.  Quincy Wesby
Sáenz defeated Wesby via knockout at 1:41 in the third round.
Middleweight bout:  Matt Korobov vs.  Lester González Perez
Korobov defeated Perez via unanimous decision (78-74, 78-74, 78-74).
Welterweight bout:  Alonso Loeza vs.  Ricardo Malfavon
Loeza and Malfavon fought to a majority draw (37-39, 38-38, 38-38).
Light Heavyweight bout:  Mike Lee vs.  Michael Birthmark
Lee defeated Birthmark via knockout at 2:56 in the third round.
Super Featherweight bout:  Paul Fleming vs.  Juan Jose Beltran
Fleming defeated Beltran via knockout at 0:52 in the first round.
Lightweight bout:  Mercito Gesta vs.  Jorge Pimentel
Gesta defeated Pimentel via knockout at 2:23 in the third round.

References

External links
Ríos vs. Antillón Official Fight Card from BoxRec

Boxing matches
2011 in boxing
Boxing in California
Sports competitions in Carson, California
July 2011 sports events in the United States